Pascual Martínez-Forteza (born 1972) is a Spanish clarinetist. Born in Palma de Mallorca, he became the first Spanish musician in the history of the New York Philharmonic orchestra in 2001. Prior to that he was a member of the Cincinnati Symphony. He studied at the University of Southern California with Yehuda Gilad and is an active soloist and chamber musician in addition to his orchestral work. He is a faculty member of Manhattan School of Music, New York University, Bard Conservatory of Music and Auxiliary teacher at Juilliard School. He regularly teaches master classes at many international music festivals, conservatories, universities and schools all over the world.

References

 Meet the Musicians, from prodigies to pros. Book by Amy Nathan 2006
 From Grupo EsComunicación Galicia

External links
 Pascual Martínez-Forteza Official website
 Faculty Pascual Martinez-Forteza at Manhattan School of Music
 Faculty biography at New York University

Personal life
He has lived in NYC since 2001. in 2005, he married  Gema Nieto-Forteza (a pianist from Madrid with whom he has a professional piano-clarinet duo since 2003) and they have three children: Patricia (2007), Alba (2010) and Hugo (2013)

1972 births
Living people
Classical clarinetists
Spanish musicians
Spanish clarinetists
21st-century clarinetists